This page lists examples of magnetic induction B in teslas and gauss produced by various sources, grouped by orders of magnitude.
 
Note:
 Traditionally, magnetizing field H, is measured in amperes per meter. 
 Magnetic induction B (also known as magnetic flux density) has the SI unit tesla [T or Wb/m2]. 
 One tesla is equal to 104 gauss.
 Magnetic field drops off as the cube of the distance from a dipole source.

Examples 
These examples attempt to make the measuring point clear, usually the surface of the item mentioned.

References

Magnetic Field
Magnetism